Fredrik Nilsson may refer to:

 Fredrik Nilsson (tennis), Swedish former professional tennis player
 Fredrik Nilsson (actor), Swedish actor who appeared in Stockholm Östra
 Fredrik Nilsson (drummer), member of the Swedish indie rock band The Sounds
 Fredrik Nilsson (football referee), Swedish referee who officiated at the 2011 FIFA U-20 World Cup
 Fredrik Nilsson (ice hockey), Swedish former ice hockey player, see 1991–92 San Jose Sharks season
Fredrik Olaus Nilsson, Swedish Baptist missionary